4,4'-Dimethylaminorex (abbreviated as 4,4'-DMAR), sometimes referred to by the street name "Serotoni", is a psychostimulant and entactogen designer drug related to aminorex, 4-methylaminorex, and pemoline. It was first detected in the Netherlands in December 2012, and has been sold as a designer drug around Europe since mid-2013.

4,4'-DMAR had been linked to at least 31 deaths in Hungary, Poland, and the UK by February 2014, mostly when consumed in combination with other drugs. Nineteen deaths linked to 4,4'-DMAR were reported in Northern Ireland in the same time period.

4,4'-DMAR acts as a potent and balanced serotonin-norepinephrine-dopamine releasing agent (SNDRA), with EC50 values for serotonin, norepinephrine, and dopamine release of 18.5 nM, 26.9 nM, and 8.6 nM, respectively.

Legality
The UK Home Office expressed intent to ban 4,4'-DMAR following advice from the Advisory Council on the Misuse of Drugs and subsequently it became a class A drug on 11 March 2015.

4,4'-DMAR is an Anlage II controlled substance in Germany .

Sweden's public health agency suggested to classify 4,4'-DMAR as hazardous substance on November 10, 2014.

4,4'-DMAR is also banned in the Czech Republic.

4,4'-DMAR is a Schedule I controlled substance in the US as of November 8, 2021. It only received two public comments during its public commenting period prior to being scheduled.

See also 
 2C-B-aminorex
 4'-Fluoro-4-methylaminorex
 4-Methylphenmetrazine
 MDMAR
 List of aminorex analogues

References 

Entactogens and empathogens
Stimulants
Designer drugs
Aminorexes
Serotonin-norepinephrine-dopamine releasing agents